Armero is a surname. Notable people with the surname include:

Álvaro Fernández Armero (born 1969), Spanish filmmaker
Francisco Armero, 1st Marquess of Nervión (1804–1866), Spanish military officer and politician
Julio Garavito Armero (1865–1920), Colombian astronomer
 Pablo Armero (born 1986), Colombian football player